is a former Japanese football player. She played for Japan national team.

National team career
On January 21, 1986, Hamada debuted for Japan national team against India. She played two games for Japan in 1986.

National team statistics

References

Year of birth missing (living people)
Living people
Japanese women's footballers
Japan women's international footballers
Women's association footballers not categorized by position